Yoga nidra or yogic sleep in modern usage is a state of consciousness between waking and sleeping, typically induced by a guided meditation. 

A state called yoga nidra is mentioned in the Upanishads and the Mahabharata, while a goddess named Yoganidrā appears in the Devīmāhātmya. Yoga nidra is linked to meditation in Shaiva and Buddhist tantras, while some medieval hatha yoga texts use "yoganidra" as a synonym for the deep meditative state of samadhi. These texts however offer no precedent for the modern technique of guided meditation. That derives from 19th and 20th century Western "proprioceptive relaxation" as described by practitioners such as Annie Payson Call and Edmund Jacobson.

The modern form of the technique, pioneered by Dennis Boyes in 1973, made widely known by Satyananda Saraswati in 1976, and then by Swami Rama, Richard Miller, and others has spread worldwide. It is applied by the US Army to assist soldiers to recover from post-traumatic stress disorder. There is limited scientific evidence that the technique helps relieve stress.

Historical usage

Ancient times 

The Hindu epic Mahabharata, completed by the 3rd century CE, mentions a state called "yoganidra", and associates it with Lord Vishnu:

The Devīmāhātmya, written around the 6th century CE, mentions a goddess whose name is Yoganidrā. The god Brahma asks Yoganidrā to wake up Vishnu to go and fight the Asuras or demigods named Madhu and Kaitabha. These early mentions do not define any yoga technique or practice, but describe the god Vishnu's transcendental sleep in between the Yugas, the cycles of the universe, and the manifestation of the goddess as sleep itself.

Medieval practices 

Yoganidra is first linked to meditation in Shaiva and Buddhist tantras. In the Shaiva text Ciñcinīmatasārasamuccaya (7.164), yoganidra is called "peace beyond words"; in the Mahāmāyātantra (2.19ab) it is named as a state in which perfected Buddhas may access secret knowledge. In the 11th or 12th century, yoganidra is first used in Hatha yoga and Raja yoga texts as a synonym for samadhi, a deep state of meditative consciousness where the yogi no longer thinks, moves, or breathes. The Amanaska (2.64) asserts that "Just as someone who has suddenly arisen from sleep becomes aware of sense objects, so the yogin wakes up from that [world of sense objects] at the end of his yogic sleep."

By the 14th century, the Yogatārāvalī (24–26) gives a more detailed description, stating that yoganidra "removes all thought of the world of multiplicity" in the advanced yogi who has completely uprooted his "network of Karma". He then enters the "fourth state", namely turiya or samadhi, beyond the usual states of waking, dreaming, and deep sleep, "that special thoughtless sleep, which consists of [just] consciousness." The 15th century Haṭha Yoga Pradīpikā goes further, stating (4.49) that "One should practice Khecarī Mudrā until one is asleep in yoga. For one who has achieved Yoganidrā, death never occurs." Khecarī Mudrā is the Hatha yoga practice of folding the tongue back so that it reaches inside the nasal cavity, where it can enable the yogi to reach samadhi. In the 17th century Haṭha Ratnāvalī (3.70), Yoganidrasana is first described. It is an asana or yoga pose where the legs are wrapped around the back of the neck. The text says that the yogi should sleep in this position, which "bestows bliss". These texts view yoganidra as a state, not a practice in itself.

Modern usage

Western "relaxationism" 

The yoga scholar Mark Singleton states that while relaxation is a primary feature of modern Western yoga, its relaxation techniques "have no precedent in the pre-modern yoga tradition", but derive mostly from 19th and 20th century Western "proprioceptive relaxation". This prescriptive approach was described by authors such as the "relaxationist" Annie Payson Call in her 1891 book Power through Repose, and the Chicago psychiatrist Edmund Jacobson, the creator of progressive muscle relaxation and biofeedback, in his 1934 book You Must Relax!.

Dennis Boyes 

In 1973, Dennis Boyes published his book Le Yoga du sommeil éveillé; méthode de relaxation, yoga nidra ("The Yoga of Waking Sleep: method of relaxation, yoga nidra") in Paris, France. This is the first known usage of "yoga nidra" in a modern sense. In the book, Boyes makes use of relaxation techniques including the direction of attention to each part of the body:

The French journal Revue 3e Millénaire, reviewing Boyes's approach in 1984, writes that Boyes proposes relaxation in order to "reach the state of emptiness". The person thus imperceptibly moves to a stage where relaxation becomes meditation, and can remain there once the mind's obsession with external objects or thoughts is removed.

Satyananda 

In modern times, Satyananda Saraswati claimed to have experienced yoga nidra when he was living with his guru Sivananda Saraswati in Rishikesh. In 1976, he constructed a system of relaxation through guided meditation, which he popularized in the mid-20th century. He explained yoga nidra as a state of mind between wakefulness and sleep that opened deep phases of the mind, suggesting a connection with the ancient tantric practice called nyasa, whereby Sanskrit mantras are mentally placed within specific body parts, while meditating on each part (of the bodymind). The form of practice taught by Satyananda includes eight stages (internalisation, resolve (sankalpa), rotation of consciousness, breath awareness, manifestation of opposites, creative visualization, repeated resolve (sankalpa) and externalisation). Satyananda used this technique, along with suggestion, on the child who was to become his successor, Niranjanananda Saraswati, from the age of four. He claimed to have taught him several languages by this method.

Satyananda's multi-stage yoga nidra technique is not found in ancient or medieval texts. However, the yoga scholars Jason Birch and Jacqueline Hargreaves note that there are analogues for several of his yoga nidra activities.

Yoga nidra in this modern sense is a state in which the body is completely relaxed, and the practitioner becomes systematically and increasingly aware of the inner world by following a set of verbal instructions. This state of consciousness is different from meditation, in which concentration on a single focus is required. In yoga nidra the practitioner remains in a state of light withdrawal of the 5 senses (pratyahara) with four senses internalised, that is, withdrawn, and only hearing still connects to any instructions given.

Swami Rama 

Swami Rama taught a form of yoga nidra (in a broad sense) which involves an exercise called shavayatra, "inner pilgrimage [through the body]", which directs the attention around "61 sacred points of the body" during relaxation in shavasana, corpse pose. A second exercise, shithali karana, is said to induce "a very deep state of relaxation", and is described as a preliminary for yoga nidra (in a narrow sense). It too is performed in shavasana, involving exhalations imagined as directed from the crown of the head to different points around the body, each repeated 5 or 10 times. The yoga nidra exercise itself involves directed breathing lying on the left side, then the right side, then in shavasana. When in shavasana, the attention is directed in turn to the eyebrow, throat, and heart centres or chakras.

Richard Miller 

The western pioneer of yoga as therapy, Richard Miller, has developed the use of yoga nidra for rehabilitating soldiers in pain, using the Integrative Restoration (iRest) methodology. Miller worked with Walter Reed Army Medical Center and the United States Department of Defense studying the efficacy of the approach. According to Yoga Journal, "Miller is responsible for bringing the practice to a remarkable variety of nontraditional settings" which includes "military bases and in veterans' clinics, homeless shelters, Montessori schools, Head Start programs, hospitals, hospices, chemical dependency centers, and jails." The iRest protocol was used with soldiers returning from Iraq and Afghanistan suffering from post-traumatic stress disorder (PTSD). The Surgeon General of the United States Army endorsed Yoga Nidra as a complementary alternative medicine (CAM) for chronic pain in 2010.

Post-lineage yoga nidra 

In 2021, the yoga teachers Uma Dinsmore-Tuli and Nirlipta Tuli jointly published a "declaration of independence for Yoga Nidrā Shakti". In it they stated that yoga nidra had become commodified and promoted by commercial organisations for profit; that abuse had taken place within those organisations; and that the organisations had propagated origin stories for yoga nidra "that privilege their own founders" and exclude or neglect older roots of the practice. They state their shock at abuses by Satyananda, Swami Rama, Amrit Desai, and Richard Miller. They invite practitioners and teachers to learn about the history of yoga nidra outside organisational boundaries, and to work without "trademarked versions" of the practice.

Reception 

The Mindful Yoga teacher Anne Cushman states that "This body-sensing journey [that I teach in Mindful Yoga] ... is one variation of the ancient practice of Yoga nidra ... and of the body-scan technique commonly used in the Buddhist Vipassana tradition." 

The cultural historian Alistair Shearer writes that the name yoga nidra is an umbrella term for different systems of "progressive relaxation or 'guided meditation'." He comments that Satyananda promoted his version of yoga nidra, claiming it was ancient, when its connections to ancient texts "seem vague at best". Shearer writes that other teachers have defined yoga nidra as "the state of conscious sleep" in which inner awareness is maintained, without reference to Satyananda's method of progressive relaxation by directing attention to different parts of the body. Shearer attributes this "inner lucidity" to the buddhi (intellect, literally "wakefulness") of Sankhya philosophy. He compares buddhi to the "intellect" discussed by Saint Augustine and the Apostolic Fathers at about the same time as Patanjali's Yoga Sutra.

Scientific evidence 

Scientific evidence for the action of yoga nidra is patchy. Parker (2019) conducted a single-observation study of a famous yogi; in it, Swami Rama demonstrated conscious entry into NREM delta wave sleep through yoga nidra, while a disciple produced delta and theta waves even with eyes open and talking. A therapeutic model was developed by Datta and Colleagues (2017) and the same appeared to be useful for insomnia patients. Datta and colleagues (2022) report a beneficial effect of yoga nidra on the sleep of 45 male athletes, noting that sportsmen often have sleep problems. Their small randomised controlled trial found improvements in subjective sleep onset latency, time in bed, and sleep efficiency with 4 weeks of yoga nidra compared to progressive muscular relaxation (used as the control).

Primary research, sometimes on a small scale, has been conducted on various aspects of yoga nidra. One found an association of yoga nidra meditation with increased endogenous dopamine release in the ventral striatum of the brain. The reduced desire for action in the state is associated with the reduced flow of blood in parts of the brain connected with controlling actions, the prefrontal cortex, the cerebellum and the subcortex.
Another study reported that yoga nidra improves heart rate variability, a measure of balance in the autonomic nervous system, whether or not it is preceded by a session of hatha yoga asanas.

Informal studies have suggested possible benefits of yoga nidra, without the large scale or strictly controlled trials that would be required to demonstrate medical benefit. A study suggested that regular practice of yoga relaxation could reduce tension and anxiety, while autonomic symptoms of high anxiety such as headache, giddiness, chest pain, palpitations, sweating and abdominal pain appeared to respond well. The approach has been used to help soldiers from war cope with posttraumatic stress disorder (PTSD). A 2019 study suggests that yoga nidra can alleviate stress and improve self-esteem of university students.

See also 

 Dream yoga

Notes

References

External links 

 Systematic review articles on Yoga Nidra indexed by Google Scholar

Sleep
Yoga as therapy